Black Narcissus is a 1947 British psychological drama film written, produced, and directed by Michael Powell and Emeric Pressburger, and starring Deborah Kerr, Sabu, David Farrar, and Flora Robson, and featuring Esmond Knight, Jean Simmons, and Kathleen Byron.  The title refers to the Caron perfume Narcisse Noir.

Based on the 1939 novel by Rumer Godden, the film revolves around the growing tensions within a small convent of Anglican sisters who are trying to establish a school and hospital in the old palace of an Indian Raja at the top of an isolated mountain above a fertile valley in the Himalayas. The palace has ancient Indian erotic paintings on its walls and is run by the agent of the Indian general who owns it, a handsome middle-aged Englishman who is a source of attraction for the sisters.

Black Narcissus achieved considerable acclaim for its technical mastery with the cinematographer, Jack Cardiff, winning an Academy Award for Best Cinematography and a Golden Globe Award for Best Cinematography, and Alfred Junge winning an Academy Award for Best Art Direction.

According to film critic David Thomson, "Black Narcissus is that rare thing, an erotic English film about the fantasies of nuns, startling whenever Kathleen Byron is involved".

Plot
General Toda Rai, the Rajput ruler of a princely state in the Himalayas, invites the Congregation of The Servants of Mary to establish a school and hospital at Mopu, a dilapidated palace situated on a high cliff. Several monks previously failed to start a school there; the general's agent  describes the social and environmental difficulties the sisters will face. The ambitious Sister Clodagh is appointed Sister Superior and is sent with four other nuns: Sister Philippa for gardening; Sister Briony for the infirmary; Sister Blanche, better known as "Sister Honey", to teach lace-making; and the emotionally unstable Sister Ruth for general classes. Mr Dean is unimpressed and predicts the women will last only until the beginning of the monsoon.

While setting up the convent, the sisters face difficulties with the old palace and also the local Hindu population, often clashing with the native caretaker, Angu Ayah. They have difficulty accepting a holy man in their grounds (the general's uncle) who spends all his time in meditation of one of the mountains. The sisters take in Kanchi, a local girl, to try and control her erratic behavior, and they also tutor the general's heir—referred to as the Young General—in Western culture prior to a trip to Britain. Ayah whips Kanchi for stealing, but the Young General stops her. He soon falls in love with Kanchi, creating a situation that Mr Dean compares to the tale of The King and the Beggar-maid.

Each convent member begins experiencing ill-health and emotional problems caused by their surroundings. Philippa loses herself in the environment and plants the vegetable garden with flowers. Ruth, already highly strung, becomes increasingly jealous of Clodagh and obsessed with Mr Dean, leading her to renounce the order. Clodagh recalls a failed romance which prompted her to join the order. Honey's growing attachment to the local children ends disastrously after she gives medication to a fatally-ill baby. The child's death angers the locals, who blame and abandon the mission, putting further strain on the sisters. Mr Dean fails to persuade Clodagh to leave before anything else untoward happens.

One night Clodagh confronts the now-unstable Ruth, finding her wearing a modern dress she ordered to entice . Ruth escapes Clodagh's watch and finds . When he rebuffs her advances, she suffers a mental breakdown and returns to the mission, intent on killing Clodagh. When Clodagh rings the morning service bell, Ruth attempts to push her over the cliff edge. In the ensuing struggle, Ruth falls to her death. The mission leaves just as the monsoon season begins, with Clodagh's final request to  that he tend Ruth's grave.

Cast

 Deborah Kerr as Sister Clodagh
 Sabu as The Young General (Dilip Rai)
 David Farrar as Mr. Dean
 Kathleen Byron as Sister Ruth
 Flora Robson as Sister Philippa
 Jean Simmons as Kanchi
 Jenny Laird as Sister Honey

 Judith Furse as Sister Briony
 Esmond Knight as The Old General
 May Hallatt as Angu Ayah
 Eddie Whaley Jr. as Joseph Anthony, the young interpreter
 Shaun Noble as Con, Clodagh's sweetheart
 Nancy Roberts as Mother Dorothea

Production

Development
Black Narcissus was adapted from Rumer Godden's 1939 novel of the same name. Michael Powell was introduced to the novel by actress Mary Morris, who had appeared in The Thief of Bagdad (1940) and an early film Powell did with Emeric Pressburger, The Spy in Black (1939). Godden had adapted her novel for a stage production for Lee Strasberg in the United States, but allowed Pressburger to write his own screenplay adaptation with Powell.

Casting
Kathleen Byron was among the first to be cast in the film, in the role of the unstable Sister Ruth. Pressburger described Byron as having a "dreamy voice and great eyes like a lynx", which he felt appropriate for the mentally disturbed character. In the role of the leading Sister Superior, Sister Clodagh, Deborah Kerr was cast. Pressburger chose Kerr for the role despite the reservations of Powell, who felt she was too young for the part. At one point, Powell considered Greta Garbo for the part.  Kerr was paid £16,000 for fifty-five days of work.

David Farrar was cast as Mr Dean, the virile British agent who becomes the object of Sister Ruth's obsession. Farrar was paid £4,500 for forty-five days of shooting. Flora Robson appears as Sister Philippa, a gardener in the convent.

Of the three principal Indian roles, only the Young General was played by an ethnic Indian, Sabu; the roles of Kanchi, played by Jean Simmons, and the Old General were performed by white actors in make-up. Kanchi, 17, is described by Godden as "a basket of fruit, piled high and luscious and ready to eat. Though she looks shyly down, there is something steady and unabashed about her; the fruit is there to be eaten, she does not mean it to rot." Godden approved of Simmons's casting, remarking that she "perfectly fulfilled my description". The Indian extras were cast from workers at the docks in Rotherhithe.

Filming

Filming of Black Narcissus began on 16 May 1946, and was completed on 22 August. The film was shot primarily at Pinewood Studios but some scenes were shot in Leonardslee Gardens, West Sussex, the home of an Indian army retiree which had appropriate trees and plants for the Indian setting. While Powell at the time had been known for his love of location shooting, with Black Narcissus he became fascinated with the idea of filming as much in-studio as possible.

The film is known for making extensive use of matte paintings and large-scale landscape paintings (credited to W. Percy Day) to suggest the mountainous environment of the Himalayas, as well as some scale models for motion shots of the convent. Powell said later: "Our mountains were painted on glass. We decided to do the whole thing in the studio and that's the way we managed to maintain colour control to the very end. Sometimes in a film its theme or its colour are more important than the plot."

For the costumes, Alfred Junge, the art director, had three main colour schemes. The sisters were always in the white habits that he designed from a medley of medieval types. These white robes of heavy material stressed the sisters' other-worldliness amid the exotic native surroundings. The chief native characters were robed in brilliant colours, particularly the generals in jewels and in rich silks. Other native characters brought into the film for "atmosphere" were clad in more sombre colours with the usual native dress of the Nepalese, Bhutanese and Tibetan peoples toned down to prevent overloading the eye with brilliance.

According to Robert Horton, Powell set the climactic sequence, a murder attempt on the cliffs of the cloister, to a pre-existing musical track, staging it as though it were a piece of visual choreography. There was some personal, behind-the-scenes tension, as Kerr was the director's ex-lover and Byron his current one. "It was a situation not uncommon in show business, I was told," Powell later wrote, "but it was new to me."

The film was intended to end with an additional scene in which Sister Clodagh sobs and blames herself for the convent's failure to Mother Dorothea. Mother Dorothea touches and speaks to Sister Clodagh welcomingly as the latter's tears continue to fall. When they filmed the scene with the rainfall on the leaves in what was to have been the penultimate scene, Powell was so impressed with it that he decided to designate that the last scene and to scrap the Mother Dorothea closing scene. It was filmed but it is not known whether it was printed.

Release

Box office
Black Narcissus had its world premiere at the Odeon Theatre in London on 4 May 1947. According to trade papers, the film was a "notable box office attraction" at British cinemas in 1947. It premiered in the United States on 13 August 1947 in New York City at the Fulton Theatre.

In France, where it released in 1949, the film sold 1,388,416 tickets. In Japan, it was the fifth top-grossing film of 1950, earning  in theatrical rentals.

Legion of Decency condemnation
In the United States, the Catholic National Legion of Decency condemned the film as "an affront to religion and religious life" for characterising it as "an escape for the abnormal, the neurotic and the frustrated". The version of the film originally shown in the United States had scenes depicting flashbacks of Sister Clodagh's life before becoming a sister edited out at the behest of the Legion of Decency.  The 10 cuts to the film, of about 900 feet of film, were supervised by Pressburger, who commented that the cuts were "reasonable, fair and just," and that he made them to further the film's distribution, as the only bookings it had while on the "condemned" list were in New York, Los Angeles and San Francisco. After the cuts were made, the Legion of Decency removed the film from the list, and further bookings were possible.

Critical response
The Manchester Guardian described the film as possessing "good acting and skilfully built-up atmosphere" and praised the cinematography. Philip Scheuer of the Los Angeles Times gave the film high praise, deeming it an "exquisite cinematic jewel", continuing: "I can't say how authentic Black Narcissus is, but the lotus land to which it carries us is uniquely unforgettable." Jane Corby of the Brooklyn Daily Eagle described the film as a "peculiar recital of religious life" and praised the cinematography, but felt that the "mixed atmosphere of religious seclusion and romantic vagaries is very confusing".

In The New York Times, Thomas M. Pryor wrote: "[t]he writing-directing duo [of Michael Powell and Emeric Pressburger]] have attained new artistic stature via "Black Narcissus". Seldom has Technicolor been used so realistically and with such exciting dramatic effect as in this picture." He also praised the film's use of miniatures and process shots in creating the atmosphere of the Himalayas, wrote that the drama was presented "exceedingly well", and said that the cast was "generally excellent."  However, Pryor also noted that the film's "detached air of cynicism [regarding the nuns] may be disturbing to some".

Awards and honors

Home media
The Criterion Collection, an American home media distribution company, released Black Narcissus on laserdisc in the early 1990s, and issued it on DVD in 2002. Noel Murray, writing for The A.V. Club, deemed the 2002 DVD as a "crackerjack release," noting it was a direct copy of the old laserdisc.

In 2008, ITV, the corporate heir to the Rank Organisation's General Film Distributors, released a restored version of the film on Blu-ray in the United Kingdom. The Criterion Collection subsequently issued the restored version on DVD and Blu-ray on 20 July 2010. Network Distributing, under license from ITV, released another Blu-ray edition in the United Kingdom in 2014.

Historical relevance
Black Narcissus was released only a few months before India achieved independence from Britain in August 1947. Film critic Dave Kehr has suggested that the final images of the film, as the sisters abandon the Himalayas and proceed down the mountain, could have been interpreted by British viewers in 1947 as "a last farewell to their fading empire"; he suggests that for the film-makers, it is not an image of defeat "but of a respectful, rational retreat from something that England never owned nor understood". The story in the film quite closely follows that of the book, which was published in 1939.

Legacy
Black Narcissus achieved acclaim for its pioneering technical mastery and shocked audiences at the time of release with its vibrant colour and the themes of the film. Audiences gasped at some of the scenes, notably the shot of the pink flowers which, shown on the big screen, was a spectacle at the time. The film's use of lighting and techniques have had a profound impact on later film makers, notably Martin Scorsese who used the extreme close-ups of the sisters as the inspiration for the treatment of Tom Cruise's character around the pool table in The Color of Money. Scorsese has said that the film, particularly in its last quarter, is one of the earliest erotic films. The film was one of his favourites as a boy and one of the greatest experiences he has had with film is viewing Black Narcissus projected on a massive screen at the Directors Guild in 1983. In Michael Powell's own view, this was the most erotic film he ever made. "It is all done by suggestion, but eroticism is in every frame and image from beginning to end. It is a film full of wonderful performances and passion just below the surface, which finally, at the end of the film, erupts." The English film critic Peter Bradshaw, who put it on his list of the ten best films ever made, took Powell's statement further, and said that it was the most erotic film he had ever seen.

In The Great British Picture Show, the writer George Perry stated, "[Powell and Pressburger's] films looked better than they were – the location photography in Technicolor by Jack Cardiff in Black Narcissus was a great deal better than the story and lifted the film above the threatening banality." In contrast, the critic Ian Christie wrote in the Radio Times in the 1980s that "unusually for a British film from the emotionally frozen forties the melodrama works so well it almost seems as if Powell and Pressburger survived the slings and barbs of contemporary criticism to find their ideal audience in the 1980s". Marina Warner, introducing the film on BBC2 (on a nun-themed film evening, with Thérèse), called it a masterpiece.

The film's resonance with populations exploring previously stifled sexual desires and expression extends beyond its contemporary milieu of women in the post-war era. Black Narcissus also influenced the themes and aesthetic of the ground-breaking gay experimental film Pink Narcissus, which portrays a series of pornographic vignettes in vivid colour as the fantasies of a prostitute between visits from his keeper. Although Pink Narcissus was lost in obscurity for some time, in recent years it has resurfaced as a cult classic, due in part to the vivid, fantastical aesthetic inspired by Black Narcissus.

The look and cinematography of the 2013 Disney film Frozen was influenced by Black Narcissus. While working on the look and nature of the film's cinematography, Frozen art director Michael Giaimo was greatly influenced by Jack Cardiff's work in Black Narcissus.

See also
 BFI Top 100 British films
 Time Out 100 best British films
 Black Narcissus (TV series), a 2020 British TV series based on the same book

References
Notes

Bibliography

External links

 
 
 
 , with a full synopsis, film stills, and clips viewable from UK libraries
 Reviews and articles at the Powell & Pressburger Pages
Black Narcissus: Empire of the Senses an essay by Kent Jones at the Criterion Collection
Sophie Goldstein on Crafting House of Women, an Art Nouveau Sci-Fi Exploration
Gemma Arterton takes the lead role in new BBC and FXP drama Black Narcissus

1947 films
1940s psychological drama films
British psychological drama films
1940s English-language films
British erotic drama films
Films about educators
Films about nuns
Films about religion
Films about sexual repression
Films based on British novels
Films based on works by Rumer Godden
Films by Powell and Pressburger
Films set in the Himalayas
Films set in Kolkata
Films set in West Bengal
Films set in the 1930s
Films set in the British Raj
Films shot at Pinewood Studios
Films whose art director won the Best Art Direction Academy Award
Films whose cinematographer won the Best Cinematography Academy Award
Films set in monasteries
1947 drama films
Films set in India
Films shot in England
1940s British films